The 1996 NCAA Division I Cross Country Championships were the 58th annual NCAA Men's Division I Cross Country Championship and the 16th annual NCAA Women's Division I Cross Country Championship to determine the team and individual national champions of NCAA Division I men's and women's collegiate cross country running in the United States. In all, four different titles were contested: men's and women's individual and team championships.

Held on November 25, 1996, the combined meet was hosted by the University of Arizona at Dell Urich Golf Course in Tucson, Arizona. The distance for the men's race was 10 kilometers (6.21 miles) while the distance for the women's race was 5 kilometers (3.11 miles). 

The men's team championship was won by Stanford (46 points), their first. The women's team championship was also won by Stanford (101 points), also their first. This was the first time since 1985 (Wisconsin) that the same program won the men's and women's titles.

The two individual champions were, for the men, Godfrey Siamusiye (Arkansas, 29:49) and, for the women, Amy Skieresz (Arizona, 17:04). This was Siamusiye's second consecutive win.

Men's title
Distance: 10,000 meters

Men's Team Result (Top 10)

Men's Individual Result (Top 10)

Women's title
Distance: 5,000 meters

Women's Team Result (Top 10)

(H) – Host team

Women's Individual Result (Top 10)

References
 

NCAA Cross Country Championships
NCAA Division I Cross Country Championships
NCAA Division I Cross Country Championships
NCAA Division I Cross Country Championships
Track and field in Arizona
Sports in Tucson, Arizona
University of Arizona
Events in Tucson, Arizona